Rubus tholiformis is a rare North American species of flowering plant in the rose family. It has been found only in eastern Canada (Québec and Nova Scotia) and the northeastern United States (Maine, New Hampshire, Vermont).

The genetics of Rubus is extremely complex, so that it is difficult to decide on which groups should be recognized as species. There are many rare species with limited ranges such as this. Further study is suggested to clarify the taxonomy. Some studies have suggested that R. tholiformis may have originated as a hybrid between R. setosus and R. hispidus.

References

tholiformis
Plants described in 1940
Flora of Quebec
Flora of Nova Scotia
Flora of the Northeastern United States
Flora without expected TNC conservation status